Events from the year 1661 in Sweden

Incumbents
 Monarch – Charles XI

Events

 The Treaty of Cardis formally discontinue the Russo-Swedish War (1656–58) with a Swedish victory and territorial gains. 
 The Stockholms Banco becomes the first European bank to print banknotes.

Births

 26 June- Johanna Eleonora De la Gardie, poet (died 1708) 
 23 September - Christiana Oxenstierna, noblewoman notorious for marrying a partner of a different social class  (died 1701)
 10 December - Catherine of Pfalz-Zweibrücken (1661–1720), princess (died 1720)  
 18 December - Christopher Polhem, Swedish scientist, inventor and industrialist  (died 1751)
 Rika Maja, Sami shaman (died 1757)

Deaths

 19 November - Lars Kagg, military officer  (born 1595)

References

 
Years of the 17th century in Sweden
Sweden